Battle of the V-1 (also known as Battle of the V.1, Battle of the V1, Missiles from Hell and Unseen Heroes) is a British war film from 1958, starring Michael Rennie, Patricia Medina, Milly Vitale, David Knight and Christopher Lee. It is based on the novel They Saved London (1955), by Bernard Newman.

Plot
The film tells the story of a Polish Resistance group, which discovers details of the manufacture of the German V-1 'Flying Bomb' at Peenemünde in 1943. Liaising with service chiefs in London, the group manage to pass on enough information to convince them to launch a bombing raid and, in the climax to the film, are able to steal a V-1 which lands in a field during testing and arrange for its transport back to the United Kingdom.

Messages are got out from the camp via the dentist (at the loss of one tooth). The Poles are warned that a British bombing raid on Peenemünde is imminent and that they should prepare to escape during the raid.

Following their escape, the second part of the film looks at the attempts to find an entire V-1 to send back to Britain. They are eventually rewarded by an unexploded V-1 landing in a field which they quickly conceal from the German search team. Through convoluted means, they send the dismantled weapon back to Britain just before the critical first use of this terrible weapon.

Cast
 Michael Rennie as Stefan 
 Patricia Medina as Zofia 
 Milly Vitale as Anna 
 David Knight as Tadek 
 Esmond Knight as Stricker 
 Christopher Lee as Brunner
 John G. Heller as Fritz 
 Carl Jaffe as General 
 Peter Madden as Stanislaw 
 George Pravda as Karewski 
 Gordon Sterne as Margraaf 
 Carl Duering as Scientist 
 Harold Siddons as Wing Commander Searby - Master Bomber
 George Pastell as Eryk
 Henry Vidon as Konim
 Jan Conrad as Wlodek
 Tom Clegg as Anton
 Geoffrey Chater as Minister of Defence
 Julian Somers as Reichfuhrer
 Gertan Klauber as SS Guard - Dentist's surgery (uncredited)
 Richard Pearson as Senior RAF Officer (uncredited) 
 Frank Thornton as British Scientist (uncredited)
 Patrick Waddington as Air Marshal (uncredited)

See also
Home Army and V-1 and V-2
Operation Most III

References

External links
 

1958 films
Films about the Royal Air Force
British World War II films
Films directed by Vernon Sewell
World War II spy films
Films shot at British National Studios
1950s English-language films
1950s British films
Films about Polish resistance during World War II